Visitors to Thailand must obtain a visa from one of the Thai diplomatic missions unless they come from a visa-exempt country or a country whose citizens are eligible to obtain visas on arrival/eVisa.

Thailand currently offers visa-free travel to nationals of 64 countries and territories. The Thai government maintains bilateral agreements on visa waivers with some of these countries. Nationals of 18 countries can obtain a visa on arrival/eVisas.

Thailand visa policy map

History 
In May 2014, there was a brief crackdown on visa runs, meaning that if foreigners wish to re-enter Thailand after their visa-free or visa on arrival period has expired they have to obtain a visa in advance, or remain outside Thailand at least for one night. In August 2014, Thailand Prime Minister ordered the Immigration Police to be more flexible as the strict application of the law was affecting schools and the tourist industry. On 31 October 2018 it was announced that within 30 days (by the end of November 2018), overstay visas will no longer be allowed, and there will be no remaining overstayers in the kingdom by that date.

Temporary Covid 19 changes 

Since Jan 2021, all passport countries with exempt entry of 30 days was extended to 45 days.

This was done to cover the additional entry requirements which involves staying for 15 days in an Alternative Quarantine (AQ). However, the extra 15 days was stopped in October 2021 and the normal 30 day visa exempt entry length resumed.

Since July 1, Thailand has allowed quarantine-free entry through a program called the Phuket Sandbox. The core requirement being that the traveller is fully vaccinated. Under this program you can travel all around Phuket after your first negative test on your first day.

On August 17 this program was expanded under the name of the "7+7" program so that your second 7 nights may be spent on Krabi, Phang-nga, or Samui. The first 7 nights could be done at Phuket or Samui only.

On November 1, Thailand reopened for incoming travel further with an Exempt from Quarantine one-night Test & Go program for Bangkok, Pattaya, Phuket and Samui, which was suspended on December 22 due to the global rise in cases from the Omicron variant of Covid-19.

Visa exemption for normal passports
Due to bilateral visa waiver agreements with Thailand, nationals of the following countries and territories holding normal passports can enter Thailand without a visa for up to the duration listed below. They may enter via any port of entry (unless otherwise specified).

1 - Length of stay extended from 30 days to 45 days; temporary policy from 1 October 2022 to 31 March 2023.
2 - for Hong Kong Special Administrative Region Passport only.

Tourist Visa Exemption Scheme
Under the Tourist Visa Exemption Scheme, nationals of countries and territories around the world are granted visa-free travel to Thailand for a stay of up to 30 days, provided the purpose of entering Thailand is for tourism only. They may apply to extend their stay for another 30 days since 29 August 2014. From 1 October 2022 to 31 March 2023, the maximum length of stay for nationals covered by the scheme has been temporarily extended from 30 days to 45 days.

Nationals of the following countries are eligible for the scheme, and may enter Thailand via any port of entry:

Nationals of the following countries and territories are also eligible for the scheme, but are limited to a maximum of two visa-exempt entries per calendar year when entering Thailand via land or sea. There is no limit imposed when entering Thailand by air.

* — Already exempt from visa requirement through a bilateral visa waiver agreement.
1 — for Hong Kong Special Administrative Region Passport only.
2 — for British citizens and British Nationals (Overseas) only.

Visa exemption for diplomatic or service category passports

Holders of diplomatic or service category passports issued by the following countries and territories are allowed to visit Thailand without a visa for visits up to 90 days (unless otherwise noted):

D — diplomatic passports only.

Visa on arrival / eVisa

Nationals of the following countries and territories may apply for a visa on arrival or an eVisa, which allows them to enter Thailand for a stay of up to 15 days at major entry points via air or land.

Visas obtained on arrival cannot be extended.

From 1 October 2022 to 31 March 2023, the maximum length of stay for nationals eligible for a visa on arrival or an eVisa has been temporarily extended from 15 days to 30 days.

* — Already exempt from visa requirement through a bilateral visa waiver agreement.

There are 48 immigration checkpoints providing visa on arrival, including:

International Airport

# - Airport which accepts e-visa on arrival

Land and harbor checkpoint

eVisa on arrival
From 21 November 2018 Thailand started issuing tourist visas valid for 15 days in a simplified procedure to visitors from the countries whose citizens are eligible for visa on arrival.

Electronic visa application also became available from February 2019 in some of the consulates of Thailand abroad.

Airports listed at previous chapter with “#” icon accept eVisa on arrival.

Visa required in advance
Citizens of the following countries can only apply for a Visa in advance in their home country's Thai Embassy. Thai Embassies abroad only accept applications of these countries' citizens if they have a resident permit of the country they want to apply from.

Transit
Passengers transiting through Suvarnabhumi Airport for less than 12 hours do not require a visa, unless they are travelling on Angkor Air, Beijing Capital Airlines, Cebu Pacific, Eastar Jet, Golden Myanmar Airlines, IndiGo, Intira Airlines, Jeju Air, Jet Asia Airways, Jetstar Asia Airways, Jetstar Pacific, Jin Air, Juneyao Airlines, Lao Central Airlines, Tigerair Mandala, Norwegian Air, Orient Thai Airlines, Regent Airways, Shandong Airlines, Sichuan Airlines, South East Asian Airlines, SpiceJet, Spring Airlines, T'way Airlines, Thai Smile, Tigerair or VietJet Air.

Those transiting through Don Mueang International Airport for less than 12 hours do not require a visa only when travelling on Thai AirAsia or Thai AirAsia X.

Citizens of Pakistan are required to obtain a visa when transiting through Thailand at all times.

APEC Business Travel Card
Holders of passports issued by the following countries who possess an APEC Business Travel Card (ABTC) containing "THA" on the back of the card can enter visa-free for business trips for up to 90 days.

ABTCs are issued to nationals of:

Mandatory yellow fever vaccination

Nationals of the following countries or nationals arriving from the following countries require an International Certificate of Vaccination in order to enter Thailand, unless they produce evidence that they do not reside in the following areas. Failure to fulfill this requirement could result in refusal of entry into Thailand.

Visa types

General visa types
Courte Upon official request, the Royal Thai Embassy may grant courtesy visas/laissez-passer to diplomats/UN officials/others who wish to enter the Kingdom on official duty and/or other purposes
Permanent resident: To qualify for this visa, you must have stayed in Thailand for 3 consecutive years with the one-year visa extensions. If married to a Thai for 5 years, one must be earning 30,000 baht/month. If single, your monthly income must be 80,000 baht minimum. 
Tourist: If an individual wishes to remain in Thailand for more than 30 days, he/she may wish to obtain a tourist visa at a Royal Thai Embassy or Consulate prior to arriving in Thailand. The tourist visa must be used within validity date, that varies with the number of entries purchased, and allows an initial stay of 60 days. After arrival in Thailand, a tourist visa or a visa exempt entry may be extended once for an additional 30 days according to immigration Bureau order 327/2557. There is a 1,900 baht fee for each extension.
Transit: This type of visa is issued to applicants who wish to enter the Kingdom for the following purposes: to travel in transit through the Kingdom in order to proceed to the country of destination or to re-enter his/her own country (category "TS"); the person in charge of or crew of a conveyance coming to a port, station, or area in the Kingdom (category "C")

Non-Immigrant visa types
Type B: to conduct business; work;  attend business conferences; teach school; attend scuba diving, muay Thai, and massage courses
Type D: diplomatic visa
Type ED: to study; to come on a work study tour or observation tour; to participate in projects or seminars; to attend a conference or training course; to study as a foreign Buddhist monk 
Type EX: to undertake skilled work or to work as an expert or specialist
Type F: to perform official duties, e.g., military exercises or governmental assignments
Type IB: to invest or perform other activities relating to investment, subject to the provision of the established laws on investment promotion
Type IM: to invest with the concurrence of the Thai ministries and governmental departments concerned 
Type M: to work as a film-producer, journalist, or reporter with permission from the Ministry of Foreign Affairs
Type O: to visit family; to perform duties for a state enterprise or social welfare organizations (NGOs);  to receive medical treatment; to be a sports coach as required by the Thai government; to be a contestant; to be a witness in a judicial process
Type O-A: retirement visa
Type R: to perform missionary work or other religious activities with the concurrence of the Thai ministries or government departments concerned
Type RS: to conduct scientific research or training or teaching in a research institute
Type S:to participate in an officially recognised sports event.

Statistics
Most visitors arriving to Thailand on short term basis were from the following countries of nationality:

Work permit 
To legally work in Thailand, a foreigner must apply for a work permit. Work permit is a legal document that states a foreigner's position, current occupation, or job description and the Thai company he is working with. It also serves as a license to perform a job or an occupation allowed for foreigners inside Thailand.
A foreigner is eligible to apply for a work permit as long as he has a non-immigrant visa or a resident visa, has an available employer who will provide documents for work permit, and the occupation he will perform is not prohibited to foreigners.

One Stop Service Centre for Visas and Work Permits 
The One Stop Service Centre for Visas and Work Permits was established on 1 July 1997 by authority of the Regulations of the Office of Prime Minister promulgated on 30 June 1997.  The objective of this centre is to simplify visa extension and permit issuance procedures to create a good investment environment.  It aims to facilitate applications of visa extension and work permits (e.g., stay permission, re-entry permit, work permit). The Centre is located on Chamchuree Square Building, Floor 18, Phatumwan, Bangkok.

Foreigners who are eligible to apply for visa extension and work permits at the One Stop Service Centre 
Foreigner who is an executive or expert with privileges accorded to them by the following laws:
Investment Promotion Act B.E. 2520 (1977);
Petroleum Act B.E. 2514 (1971);
Industrial Estate Authority of Thailand Act B.E. 2522 (1979);
Foreigner who is an investor.
If investing not less than 2 million Baht, he or she will be granted a 1-year permit.
If investing not less than 10 million Baht, he or she will be granted a 2-year permit.
Foreigner who is an executive or expert.
Foreigner's associated company should be registered with capital or possess asset of not less than 30 million Baht.
Foreigner who is a member of the foreign press must present a letter from the Ministry of Foreign Affairs and a copy of an ID Press Card issued by the Department of Public Relations.
Foreigner who is a researcher or developer on science and technology.  
Foreigner who is employed in a branch office of an overseas bank, foreign banking office of an overseas bank, provincial foreign banking office of an overseas bank or a representative office of the foreign bank in which all offices are certified by the Bank of Thailand.
Foreigner who works on the necessary and urgent basis for a period of no longer than 15 days.
Foreigner who is an official of the representative office for foreign juristic persons concerning the International Trading Business and Regional Office of Transnational Corporation in accordance to the Foreign Business Act B.E. 2542 (1999).
Foreigner who is an expert on information technology.
Foreigner who works at regional operating headquarters.

See also

Visa requirements for Thai citizens
Thai passport
Thai national ID card
Tourism in Thailand

References

External links
Thailand Immigration Bureau
Thailand Ministry of Foreign Affairs
Thailand Visa on Arrival
More Info

Thailand